Odigitis festival (named after the central publication of KNE and the poem of Kostas Varnalis "Odigitis"), is a series of annual festivals organized in most of the major towns and cities of Greece by the Communist Youth of Greece (KNE).

References

Communist press festivals
Festivals in Greece